Lake Sara is an 800-acre reservoir located four miles west of the city of Effingham in Effingham County, Illinois.

Lake Sara's attractions include a two marinas, a public beach, two restaurants, various rental properties (including a camp ground), and several area golf courses.  The lake offers boating, fishing, swimming, kayaking, and paddle boarding.

The lake was built and is owned by the Effingham Water Authority, a public entity established in 1955 by a 4–1 vote of Effingham City Council, in response to a water shortage felt throughout much of the Midwest at the time.

Named after an active benefactor (Sara Pearson), Lake Sara was publicly dedicated on November 10, 1957, following the delivery of a keynote address by Hon. William G. Stratton, Governor of Illinois.

Habitat enhancement structures were dropped in the Lake to attract aquatic life. The Effingham Water Authority has proposed a 30-acre recreation installment at the Lake as a way of transitioning the lake to a public park.

References

External links 
 effinghamwaterauthority.org
 https://www.enjoyillinois.com/explore/listing/lake-sara

Bodies of water of Effingham County, Illinois
Reservoirs in Illinois